Abnama Rural District is a rural district (dehestan) in the Central District of Rudan County, Hormozgan Province, Iran. At the 2006 census, its population was 17,855, in 3,747 families. The rural district has 22 villages.

References 

Rural Districts of Hormozgan Province
Rudan County